Sachchidananda Sinha College, Aurangabad was established in 1943 by a local dignitary, renounced pleader and social worker Shree Akhouri Krishna Prakash Sinha alias Tripurari babu with the moral support of his friends Dr.Sachchidananda Sinha and Bihar-Vibhuti Dr.Anugrah Narayan Sinha. It is the oldest college under Magadh University, Bodh Gaya, Bihar  and converted into constituent unit of this university in 1974. It imparts teaching up to honours degree level in major sixteen subjects of Humanities, Social Science, Science and Commerce.

Campus of Sachchidananda Sinha College
The college is situated 3 km away from the main market of the town on Poiwan road, attracts the attention of the passers by with its vast campus emanating greenery from its green trees. It occupies the landed area of more than 18 acres total construction is approx 14 acre..

Facilities at Sachchidananda Sinha College
Library- College has own Central Library with the approx 50,000 books, have study room webopac system and latest journals.
Class Rooms- College has sufficient class room with green board/white board/digital board and sufficient light and fan.
Computer Lab- College has own fully lan networked computer lab with advanced computer set and internet facility.
Hostel- College has two hostels, one for boys and the other for girls.
Internet Facility- College has fully wifi campus.
Drinking Water- College has own Centralised and departmental RO System for students and staff.
Toilets- College has toilets facility for boys and girls separately and special toilets facility for physically disabled.
RF ID System- College has an automated attendance system for vocational course students and staff.
CCTV- College campus is 24X7 CCTV surveillance

Faculties at Sachchidananda Sinha College
College provide education under these faculty, science, arts, commerce, and different technical and vocational courses.

Subject
PG Course-Science(Physics/Chemistry/Mathematics/Botany/Zoology)
Commerce
UG Course-Science(Physics/Chemistry/Mathematics/Botany/Zoology)
Arts(Hindi/English/Urdu/Sanskrit/Economics/History/Geography/Pol-Science/philosophy)
Vocational-[Education(B.Ed.)
Pharmacy (B.Pharm)
Business Administrative (MBA)
Advertising Sales Promotion and Sales Management (BASPSM)
Business Management (BBM)
Computer Science(MCA/BCA)
Library and Information Science(BLIS)
Biotechnology(B.Sc. Biotechnology)
Information Technology (B.Sc. I.T.)

References

External links
 SSC Website
 Library S.Sinha College

Colleges affiliated to Magadh University
Aurangabad district, Bihar
Universities and colleges in Bihar
Educational institutions established in 1943
1943 establishments in India